The Philippines participated in the 1982 Asian Games held in New Delhi, India from November 19 to December 4, 1982. Ranked 10th with 2 gold medals, 3 silver medals and 9 bronze medals with a total of 14 over-all medals.

Asian Games Performance
A year after emerging as the country's newest track sensation with a golden double at the 1981 Manila Southeast Asian Games, Lydia de Vega became Asia's sprint darling, winning the century dash in the 1982 Asian Games. The 17-year old De Vega bagged the 100-meter dash in 11.76 seconds to become Asia's fastest woman.

It was only one of the two gold medals won by the 114-man contingent, but it was enough to brighten another dismal performance by the Philippines in the quadrennial meet. A swimmer named William "Billy" Wilson maintained swimming's legacy as a perennial source of medals, winning the gold medal in the 200-meter freestyle.

Medalists 

The following Philippine competitors won medals at the Games.

Gold

Silver

Bronze

Multiple

Medal summary

Medal by sports

References

External links
 Philippine Olympic Committee official website

Nations at the 1982 Asian Games
1982
Asian Games